The Secretary of Finance is a member of the Virginia Governor's Cabinet.  The office is currently vacant.

List of Secretaries of Finance

Secretary of Finance (July 1, 1972–July 1, 1976)
 Walter Craigie (1972–1973)
 William H. Forst (1973–1974)
 Maurice B. Rowe (1974–1976)

Secretary of Administration and Finance (July 1, 1976–July 1, 1984)
 Maurice B. Rowe (1976–1978)
 Charles Walker (1978–1981)
 Stuart Connock (1981–1982)
 Wayne F. Anderson (1982–1984)

Secretary of Finance (July 1, 1984–present)
 Stuart Connock (1984–1990)
 Paul W. Timmreck (1990–1996)
 Ronald L. Tillett (1996–2001)
 John W. Forbes II (2001–2002)
 John M. Bennett (2002–2006)
 Jody Wagner (2006–2008)
 Ric Brown (2008–2018)
 Aubrey Layne (2018–2021)
 Joe Flores (2021–2022)
 Stephen E. Cummings (nominee)

References

1972 establishments in Virginia
Government agencies established in 1972
Finance
Finance